The Groupes Bibliques Universitaires (GBU) are student groups that meet at universities or nearby for in-depth Bible study. They were founded in the beginning of the 20th century and currently operate in an officially recognized way in more than 154 countries, with a presence in 168 countries.

The goal of the GBU is to discuss  Biblical texts and to make the Bible known in the academic world. Though they have a clear evangelical Christian orientation, those groups are non-denominational and are open to all students. The French and Swiss GBU are founding members of the International Fellowship of Evangelical Students (Union Internationale des Groupes Bibliques Universitaires), a network of like-minded campus organizations around the world.

Origins of the GBU

Forerunners 
In the 17th century in Scotland, groups of students began to meet on their own initiative in order to study the Bible and pray together. Similar groups were reported in England and then in the United States of America in the 18th century under a variety of names. The goal of those “societies” was mainly to grow in faith through prayer, exhortation and the discussion of theological subjects. They were often kept secret to avoid   the suspicion of excessive spiritualism.

At the same time in continental Europe, German pietism and its extensions had a huge impact among students with an emphasis on witnessing and evangelism. This concern grew in several groups in America in the beginning of the 19th century. It resulted in remarkable missionary commitments within the large missionary societies which had been created over the previous century.   A need  was felt to establish relationships between universities.  It was also the time of the great awakenings which occurred in many European countries, paving the way for more interdenominational cooperation and alliances.

During the second half of the 19th century, several evangelical youth organisations developed worldwide with significant ramifications among students (e.g. Young Men’s and Young women’s Christian Associations). Following its predecessors, the emphasis on global mission increased considerably (e.g. Student Volunteer Movement for Foreign Missions).

The first GBU 
The foundation of the organization  has been traced back to 1877 with the creation in Cambridge University  of the  CICCU (Cambridge Inter-Collegiate Christian Union). Several factors had prepared the ground: a strong evangelical presence in the University for a century, a Missionary Union that had been encouraged by David Livingstone and prayer meetings that had been held on a daily basis for several years. In 1873,  groups in London hospitals founded the Medical Prayer Union. With the Christian Union in Oxford, which had been founded in 1881, all those groups created the SCM (Student Christian Movement of Great Britain|Student Christian Movement).

Similar movements developed in other countries, especially in the English-speaking world. They joined together into a world evangelical and missionary federation : the WSCF (World Student Christian Federation).

An heir of 19th century rationalism, theological liberalism or modernism exerted growing influence over many churches and thus over Christian organisations. Little by little, the line of the founders was set aside, with its emphasis on the primacy of the Gospel and on the authority of the Scriptures.

The SCM’s responsiveness to the new ideas resulted in serious differences of views. In 1910, the CICCU was therefore sidelined because it wanted to remain faithful to the biblical foundations. From then on, the two movements developed independently.

After the shock of the First World War, the activities of CICCU and similar groups resumed. The movement expanded progressively to a great number of universities in Great Britain. In places, some common ground could be found with the WSCF, but the split was complete a few years later due to serious ideological drift. At the international level, some GBU are involved in humanitarian actions.

The GBU in France

Organization 
In France, the GBU are also called AGBUF (Association des Groupes Bibliques Universitaires de France),  constituted in accordance with the French law of 1901 concerning  non-profit organisations. They bring together students who are eager to study the Bible. They provide them with the opportunity to meet at or around universities and to deepen their knowledge together with other students.

Local groups are run autonomously. The GBU is a student organisation. All its student activities are under the responsibility of the Student Executive Committee which reports to a supervisory board, the National Council. The main activity is reading the Bible together. Meetings are open to all and everyone is free to share their beliefs concerning the Scriptures. At the international level, the French GBU are a founding member of IFES (International Fellowship of Evangelical Students).

History  
 In 1942, during the German occupation of France, some students began to meet in Aix-en-Provence in order to pray and study the Bible together.
They were encouraged by M. René Pache, the founder of the Swiss GBU in 1932 and vice-president of IFES in 1947, who was the speaker at the first GBU camp in Anduze in 1943.  Immediately afterwards, groups of university and high school students were formed in Marseilles, Montpellier, Nimes and Alès, and a year or two later in Grenoble, Lyon, Paris and Bordeaux. The “Union des GBU de France” was officially established in 1950.

The events of 1968 sent shock waves that tremendously affected university life and reverberated within the GBU. The following decade was one of unprecedented development. Groups multiplied, more students were committed and became members of the GBU, large Easter congresses were organised, more people were contacted  In 1976, the PBU (Presses Bibliques Universitaires) were established jointly with the Swiss and Belgian GBUs. Books were published on  issues such as culture, ideologies, nuclear power, poetry, etc.

Around 1,000 students currently gather weekly in over 90 groups in France. In Swiss Romande, around 600 students meet every week in about 50 groups.

Supporters 
When they have finished their studies, students are invited to remain members of AGBUF in order to ensure the continuity of the movement and its development.

The Friends of the GBU used to be organised in a separate organisation. The AGBUF is now made both of students who take an active role in local groups and of post-graduates. The latter are willing to help maintain and develop the movement they entered during their studies. These post-graduates and friends are invited to create local support groups in order to help to develop local GBU groups.

Other French-speaking GBU

Europe 
 GBU Belgium
 GBEU Swiss Romandy

Africa 
  GBEEB Benin
 UGB Burkina
 GBUS Democratic Republic of the Congo
 GBU Ivory Coast (GBUCI)
 GBUS Togo
 GBU Mali
 UGB Madagascar

French Overseas Territories 
  GBU Guadeloupe 
  GBU Antilles et French Guiana

Americas 
 GBUC Canada

References

External links
 French GBU official website
 Presses Bibliques Universitaires de France
 Creusons la Bible
 Question Suivante
 IFES (International Fellowship of Evangelical Students)

Biblical studies organizations